Bar Nothin' (sometimes written as Bar Nothing) is a 1921 American silent Western film directed by Edward Sedgwick and starring Buck Jones, Ruth Renick and Arthur Edmund Carewe.

Cast
 Buck Jones as Duke Smith
 Ruth Renick as Bess Lynne
 Arthur Edmund Carewe as Stinson 
 Jim Farley as Bill Harliss
 William Buckley as Harold Lynne

References

Bibliography
 Connelly, Robert B. The Silents: Silent Feature Films, 1910-36, Volume 40, Issue 2. December Press, 1998.
 Munden, Kenneth White. The American Film Institute Catalog of Motion Pictures Produced in the United States, Part 1. University of California Press, 1997.
 Solomon, Aubrey. The Fox Film Corporation, 1915-1935: A History and Filmography. McFarland, 2011.

External links
 

1921 films
1921 Western (genre) films
American silent feature films
Silent American Western (genre) films
American black-and-white films
1920s English-language films
Fox Film films
Films directed by Edward Sedgwick
1920s American films